Simon Lundevall (born 23 September 1988) is a Swedish professional footballer who plays as a midfielder for Halmstad.

Club career
On 2 October 2020, Lundevall returned to Sweden and signed with Halmstad.

Honours

Individual
Allsvenskan Top assist provider: 2017

References

External links

1988 births
Living people
Swedish footballers
Association football midfielders
Eskilstuna City FK players
Västerås SK Fotboll players
Gefle IF players
IF Elfsborg players
NorthEast United FC players
Volos N.F.C. players
Halmstads BK players
Ettan Fotboll players
Superettan players
Allsvenskan players
Indian Super League players
Sweden international footballers
Swedish expatriate footballers
Swedish expatriate sportspeople in India
Expatriate footballers in India
Swedish expatriate sportspeople in Greece
Expatriate footballers in Greece
People from Eskilstuna
Sportspeople from Södermanland County